In Japan,  are human teeth, especially upper canines, with an uncommonly fang-like appearance.  most often refers to a tooth overlapping another tooth or protruding from higher in the gum. In Japan it is perceived as a sign of youthfulness and natural beauty. In 2013 it had become a trend where teenage girls would undergo dental procedures to cap the upper canines.

References 

Teeth
Japanese culture
Japanese words and phrases